Nationality words link to articles with information on the nation's poetry or literature (for instance, Irish or France).

Events
 James I of England creates Poet Laureate position for Ben Jonson

Works published

Great Britain
 John Davies, published anonymously, Wits Bedlam, epigrams
 Leonard Digges, The Rape of Proserpine, translated from the Latin of Claudius Claudianus' De raptu Proserpinae
 William Drummond, published anonymously, Forth Feasting, written on the occasion of James I's visit to Scotland

Other
 Martin Opitz  Aristarchus, German poet and writer in Latin, in this book championing the purity of the German language
 Antoine Girard de Saint-Amant, A la solitude, ("Solitude"), an ode (untranslated text in French) France

Births
Death years link to the corresponding "[year] in poetry" article:
 April 4 – Sir George Wharton, 1st Baronet (died 1681), English Cavalier soldier and astrologer, also known as a poet
 September 25 (bapt.) – Henry Birkhead (died 1696), English academic, lawyer, Latin poet and founder of the Oxford Chair of Poetry
 December 9 – Richard Lovelace (died 1657), English Cavalier poet
 Peter Folger (died 1690), English-born poet, Nantucket settler, and maternal grandfather of Benjamin Franklin
 Pierre Petit (died 1687), French scholar, physician, poet and Latin writer

Deaths
Birth years link to the corresponding "[year] in poetry" article:
 August 8 – Tarquinia Molza (born 1542), Italian singer and poet
 Giovanni Botero (born 1544), Italian political theorist, priest, poet, and diplomat
 Keshavdas (born 1555), Sanskrit scholar and Hindi poet
 Riccardo Luisini (born 1535), Italian, Latin-language poet
 Eochaidh Ó hÉoghusa (born 1567), Irish
 François du Souhait (born between 1570 and 1580), French language translator, novelist, poet, satirist, and moral philosopher

See also

 Poetry
 16th century in poetry
 16th century in literature

Notes

17th-century poetry
Poetry